The Benktander type I distribution is one of two distributions introduced by Gunnar  to model heavy-tailed losses commonly found in non-life/casualty actuarial science, using various forms of mean excess functions . The distribution of the first type is "close" to the log-normal distribution .

See also 
 log-normal distribution
 Benktander type II distribution

Notes

References

Continuous distributions